Denis Gorbunenko (born December 9, 1973, Donetsk) is a famous Ukrainian banker and financier.

Prior to his career as a financier he held a variety of senior roles in banking including as Chief Executive Officer of Rodovid Bank.

During Mr Gorbunenko's tenure as CEO, Rodovid Bank experienced unprecedented growth becoming one of the leading banks in the country.

In 2008, the majority shareholderof Rodovid Bank announced the sale of the controlling interest to the Istil Group, owned by Muhammad Zahoor. Mr Gorbunenko did not agree with the decision. On 13 January 2009 he resigned as CEO of Rodovid Bank to focus on his investment projects.

1973 births
Living people
Businesspeople from Donetsk
Ukrainian bankers